Eagris tetrastigma, commonly known as the black flat, is a species of butterfly in the family Hesperiidae. It is found in Guinea, Sierra Leone, Liberia, Ivory Coast, Ghana, Togo, Nigeria, Cameroon, the Republic of the Congo, the Central African Republic, the Democratic Republic of the Congo and Uganda. The habitat consists of primary and secondary forests.

Subspecies
Eagris tetrastigma tetrastigma - eastern Nigeria, Cameroon, Democratic Republic of Congo, Congo, Central African Republic, western Uganda
Eagris tetrastigma subolivescens (Holland, 1892) - Guinea, Sierra Leone, Liberia, Ivory Coast, Ghana, Togo, western Nigeria

References

Butterflies described in 1891
Tagiadini
Butterflies of Africa